Weeb, or weeaboo, is derogatory slang for a Japanophile.

Weeb or WEEB may also refer to:

 Weeb Ewbank (1907–1998), American football coach
 WEEB, a radio station licensed to Southern Pines, North Carolina